Kombolcha is the name of several communities and woredas in Ethiopia:
 for the town in the Amhara Region, which is also organized as a woreda, see Kombolcha;
 for the town in the Oromia Region, also known as Kombosha, see Guduru;
 the woreda in the Misraq Hararghe Zone of Oromia, see Kombolcha (woreda);